HMS Blenheim was a  first class protected cruiser that served in the Royal Navy from 1890 to 1926. She was built by Thames Ironworks & Shipbuilding Company at Leamouth, London.  The ship was named after the Battle of Blenheim.

Description
Her main armament was two BL 9.2 inch Mk VI guns (234 mm) and six QF 6 inch guns (152 mm) on the upper deck, and four QF 6 inch guns in 150 mm compound armoured casemates on the main deck. She also carried sixteen 3-pounders, and four 14 inch torpedo tubes (two submerged and two above water).

Service history

Having been launched on 5 July 1890, she was commissioned at Chatham on 1 January 1891.

The then Canadian Prime Minister, Sir John Thompson, died in England just after being sworn in as a member of Queen Victoria's Privy Council in December 1894: he was repatriated to Halifax, Nova Scotia on the Blenheim, which was painted black for the occasion.

On 27 January 1897 Blenheim accidentally rammed and badly damaged the French five masted barque  France I, one of the longest tallships afloat at the time. France 1 was anchored off Dungeness point showing two mooring lights (one at the bow and one at the stern). Though sea regulations of the time called for only one mooring light at the bow, it was usual practice to  show another one at the stern on unusually long ships, a practice that was soon enforced into a law soon after this particular accident. The watch officer of Blenheim thought the lights were from two distinct ships anchored well apart and headed his own ship into the middle. The watchmen aboard France I shouted, sounded the ship bell, fired flares and blew the foghorn, and Blenheim altered course at the last possible instant and gave France I a glancing blow instead of a full broadside-on ramming that would probably have sunk her, as period warships had ram bows, a very deadly feature as shown by the  /  collision. France I did not sink and went carrying on the Europe - Chile trade after extensive dockyard repairs until 1901, but a British court blamed the French ship and refused to acknowledge HMS Blenheim's responsibility, a decision that was bitterly resented in maritime circles, both in France and wider afield.

She was recommissioned on 2 January 1901 with a complement of 593 men to serve at the China station to support the British position during the Boxer Rebellion. In June 1902 she visited Nagasaki,.

She then served as a cruiser with the Channel Squadron until May 1908 when she joined the Mediterranean Fleet as a destroyer depot ship. Whilst being used as a depot ship, future Rear-Admiral and VC winner Eric Gascoigne Robinson served aboard her.  She was sent to Mudros in March 1915 in support of the Mediterranean Expeditionary Force at the Battle of Gallipoli.  Later that year, Blenheim repatriated former Canadian Prime Minister Sir Charles Tupper who had died in England, to Halifax.

Blenheim was scrapped in 1926 at Pembroke Dock.

Notes

References
 
  Roger Chesneau and Eugene M. Kolesnik, ed., Conway's All the World's Fighting Ships 1860–1905, (Conway Maritime Press, London, 1979),

External links

  Transcription of ship's logbooks May 1914 to August 1917

 

Blake-class cruisers
Ships built in Leamouth
World War I cruisers of the United Kingdom
1890 ships
Battenberg family